The Ministry of Science and Technology (MoST) was a ministry of the government of South Korea which coordinated science and technology activities in the country. In 2008, it was combined with another ministry and renamed the Ministry of Education, Science and Technology. However the current Korean government under Park Geun-hye has re-launched the ministry with the name under the Ministry of Science, ICT and Future Planning.

External links 
 Official website (English version)

Government ministries of South Korea
Science and technology in South Korea
South Korea